The Kerry Under-21 Hurling Championship (known for sponsorship reasons as the Acorn Life Kerry County Under-21 Hurling Championship) is an annual hurling competition organised by the Kerry County Board of the Gaelic Athletic Association for the top Under-21 hurling teams in the county of Kerry in Ireland.

The first County Championship at this age grade took place in 1979 and was won by Causeway. Prior to this, Under-21 championships were held at divisional level only.

The series of games are played during the autumn and winter months. Weather conditions and fixture congestion have, on a number of occasions, led to the final stages of the competition not being completed within the calendar year.

The 2009 competition does not appear to have been completed, with the final (due to be contested between St Brendan's, Ardfert and Kilmoyley) unplayed. The 2020 and 2021 competitions were not commenced due to the impact of the COVID-19 pandemic on Gaelic games.

Trophy
The original Atlantic Oils Perpetual Cup was presented to the winners from 1979 until 2007. The original trophy was replaced in 2008 when a new trophy was presented by Brendan Horgan of Atlantic Oils to the Kerry County Board . This trophy is sometimes referred to as the Denis Horgan Cup in memory of the founder of the Atlantic Oils company.

Roll of honour

Finals listed by year

References

Hurling competitions in County Kerry